The Sond’Ar-te Electric Ensemble is a Portuguese chamber ensemble, based in Lisbon, which specialises in contemporary classical music. This is an innovative music ensemble in the European new music scene which the core structure is the permanent combination of 5 acoustic instruments (flute, clarinet, violin, cello, piano) with electronics relying on the Miso Studio’s technical expertise.

The Sond’Ar-te Electric Ensemble’s repertoire covers some of the most important works for ensemble up to 5 and 8 instruments of the 20th and 21st centuries. One of the key features of this project is the commission of new works, hence encouraging the strong and vibrant development of contemporary chamber music with electronics, with a special attention given to Portuguese creation.

The Sond’Ar-te Electric Ensemble composed by a young generation pool of exceptional musicians with individual careers as soloists, has gained since his premiere in September 2007 an outstanding technical level and is already a reference in Portugal and abroad. In addition to its concert circulation around Portugal, Paris, Warsaw Autumn Festival, Bilbao Guggenheim Museum, City of London Festival, Seoul, Tokyo and Berlin, the Sond’Ar-te is strongly involved in media music theatre projects, in the development of educational activities such as the Forum for Young Composers and nurturing new audiences by presenting special programmes for children.

Premieres 

The Sond'Ar-te Electric Ensemble has premiered since its creation over 80 works of composers such as: Jonathan Harvey, Flo Menezes, Peter Swinnen, Paulo Ferreira-Lopes, Eduardo Reck Miranda, Takayuki Rai, Leilei Tian, Pedro Rebelo,  Tiago Cutileiro, Flo Menezes, José Luís Ferreira, Philippe Leroux, Clarence Barlow, Luís Tinoco, Isabel Soveral, John McLachlan, Masataka Matsuo, Pedro Amaral, Miguel Azguime, Bruno Gabirro, Abel Paúl, Cândido Lima, Ivo Nilsson, João Madureira, Byung-moo Lee, João Pedro Oliveira.

Discography 

The ensemble recorded 4 CDs devoted to the Portuguese contemporary classical music, 3 of them within the "Sond'Ar-te Electric Ensemble Soloists" series.

Review on the New Music Review Lounge by António Ferreira to the Cd "Nuno Pinto - clarinet & electronics: “The undeniable Nuno Pinto’s artistry, combining a wide range of classical and contemporary instrumental techniques with a willingness to participate in more experimental music creation, establishes the conditions for a rewarding performance of the electro/acoustic works presented on this CD." (...) "The CD is yet another proof that Nuno Pinto is a clarinettist of the first order. The compositions are performed with great skill and confidence, as he feels clearly comfortable whilst performing in an amplified setting with electronics. The quality of the recording is excellent and the overall balance between the acoustic and the electronic spots on."

References

External links 
 Sond'Ar-te Electric Ensemble Official Website

Portuguese musical groups
Chamber orchestras
Contemporary classical music ensembles